Neothais harpa is a species of sea snail, a marine gastropod mollusk in the family Muricidae, the murex snails or rock snails.  The Neothais harpa is classified as part of the Muricidae family and Neothais genus. This species was previously known as the Purpura harpa (Conrad, 1837) before it was changed. This name is currently unaccepted. The parent species is the Neothais Iredale, (1912). Species originates from the Muriciae family, common family to the Murex shells.

Description
Shell sizes vary from medium to large. Known for raised spires and strong sculpture with spiral ridges. Sizes range from 20-29mm.

Distribution
Known distribution in Eastern Central Pacific. Found in marine environments, typically benthic and tropical. Commonly found basalt shorelines of the windward islands. The Neothais harpa is endemic to Hawaii. Uncommon shell.

References
 

Muricidae
Gastropods described in 1837